Astronomer Royal for Scotland was the title of the director of the Royal Observatory, Edinburgh until 1995. It has since been an honorary title.

Astronomers Royal for Scotland

See also

 Edinburgh Astronomical Institution
 City Observatory
 Royal Observatory, Edinburgh
 Astronomer Royal
 Royal Astronomer of Ireland

References

 

Lists of office-holders in Scotland
Scottish royalty
Positions within the British Royal Household
Ceremonial officers in the United Kingdom